Goodykoontz is a surname. Notable people with the surname include:
Bess Goodykoontz (1894–1990), American educator
Frank Goodykoontz (1842–1898), American politician from Iowa
Jasper Goodykoontz (1855–1923), American writer
Wells Goodykoontz (1872–1844), American politician from West Virginia